List of works by Toyohara Chikanobu includes artwork created over many decades and in a range of formats.

Details about the woodblock prints of Toyohara Chikanobu are provided below in a specific format:
(1) the transliterated title employing Wiki-romanization criteria;
(2) the title (enclosed in parentheses) of the work  reproduced using the kanji and hiragana found in the title cartouche;
(3) the number {enclosed in curly brackets} of prints in the series (where known), excluding the covers, the moku roku, and any introductory or complementary pages;
(4) the Gregorian calendar date(s) «enclosed in doubled angle brackets» calculated from the date found in the otodoke or in the vertical margins of the print, which showed the Meiji calendar year, month, and day that authorities accepted a notification of intent to publish;
(5) a referral [enclosed in square brackets] to the section containing the publisher's name and address; 
(6) an English translation of the title.

Yotsugiri-e
A partial list of single-panel series in yotsugiri format includes:
Chūshingura (忠臣蔵) {12} «1884»  Chūshingura
 (本朝皇統記) «1878» [25]  The History of the Imperial Line of Our Country
 (東京花竸) «1879» [29] Comparing the Flowers of Tokyo.

Ōban yoko-e
A partial list of single-panel series in ōban yoko-e format includes:
 (冠化十二ヶ月の内) {12} «1880» [24] Twelve Months at Home with the Royal Ladies
 (教育東美人會十二ヶ月全) {12}  The Education of Beautiful Women in Edo throughout the Whole Year
 (平家物語) «1898» [3] The Tale of the Heike
 (東風俗目録) {12} «1901» [15] An Annal of Eastern Pastimes
 (江戸錦) {36} «1903-5» [15] Edo Brocade
 (幼稚花) «1905» [] Flowers of Childhood
 (教育歴史画布) {24} «1906» [4] Educational Pictorial Album of  History

Chūban yoko-e
Prints in chūban yoko-e format include:
 (善悪両頭教訓鑑) «1882» [ ] Examples of Moral Precepts Employing the Two Heads of Good and Evil
 (本朝武勇鑑)  {20} «1882» [10] Models of Our Country's Valor
 (千代田乃風俗)  {12} «1883» [] Customs at Chiyoda

Chūban  tate-e
Prints in chūban tate-e format include:
 (都の花色) «unk» probably a hikifuda  (advertising circular) for cloth/clothing, published by Tōkyō hatsubaimoto (Tokyo sales agency)

Ōban tate-e
A partial list of single-panel series in ōban tate-e format includes:
 (今様美人竸) «1877» [27] Comparing Modern Women
 (戰地八景) «1877» [] Eight Views of the War
 (鹿児島英名傳) «1877» [21] Reports of the Heroes of Kagoshima
 (鹿児島勇婦傳) «1877» [13] Reports of the Heroines of Kagoshima
 (鹿児嶋珍聞) «1877» [25] Extraordinary News from Kagoshima
 (東姿四季の詠) «1879–1881» [20] Compositions in the Eastern Style for the Four Seasons
 (英銘武将之面) «1880» [12] Faces of Famous Military Commanders
 (花姿美人樣) «~1880» [8] Alluring Flowers as Beautiful Women
 (今様美人鏡) «1881» [22] Reflections of the Modern Woman
 (當狂言名譽俳優) «1882» [28] Hit Plays with Famous Actors
 (東京名所竸) «1882» [12] Comparing the Famous Places of Tokyo 
 (開化教育鞠唄) «1883» [18] Songs of Enlightenment and Education
 (英雄 武者 鏡) «1883» [] Mirror of Heroic Warriors
 (名譽色咲分) «1883-4» [1] Honorable Flowers Blooming in Different Colors
 (東京名所) «1884», [31] Famous Places in Tokyo
 (雪月花) Snow, Moon, Flower 
 (源平盛衰記) «1885» [10] A Chronicle of the Rise and Fall of the Minamoto and the Taira
 (東錦晝夜竸) «1886» [1, 10] {50}  Brocade of the East, A Contrast of Day and Night 
 (當戌の狂言つくし) «1886» [ ] A Collection of This Season's Kyōgen
 (徳川家系略記) «1886-7» [8] A Brief Account of the Tokugawa Lineage
 (當春姿見竸) «1887» [30] A full-length mirror comparison this spring
 (今様東京八景) {8} «1888» [11] Eight Views of Tokyo Today
 (開花美人競) «1889» [6] A Contest between Blossoms and Beautiful Women
 (東風俗福つくし) {30} «1889–1890» [9] Customs of the Capital displayed by Homonyms of the word 
 (東風俗年中行事) {12} «1890» [11] Annual Events and Customs in the Capital
 (二十四孝見立画合) {24} «1890-1» [2] A Contrasting Parody of The Twenty-four Filial Exemplars
 (馬琴著述) {?} «1890-1» [6] Stories by Bakin
 (幻燈寫心竸) {20} «1890-2» [7] Daydreams by Magic Lantern
 (富嶽集) «1891» [1] A Collection of Scenes of Mt. Fuji
 (東鑑) «1892» [26] Mirror of the East
 (見立十二支) {12} «1893-4» [6] A Contrasting Parody of the Zodiac
 (日 清戰爭圖繪) «1894» [] Pictures of the Sino-Japanese War
 (婦人束髪縮圖) «1895» [17] Reduced Drawings of Western-style Hairdos for Women
 (四季の花狂言見立) «1895» [16] Comparing Dramas to Flowers of the Four Seasons
 (あづま) {24} «1896,1904» [3,15] The East 
 (時代鑑) {50} «1896-8» [15] A Mirror of the Ages
 (真美人) {36} «1897-8» [14] Truly Beautiful Women
 (東京名所) «1897–1902» [23] Famous Places of Tokyo
 (鹿兒島英名傅) [21] Chronicles of the Glories of the Satsuma Revolt

Two of his well-known ōban tate-e diptych series include:
 (名所美人合) «1897-8» [15] An Exposition of Beautiful Women in Scenic Places
 (日本名女咄) «1893» [5] Very Tall Stories about Famous Women of Japan

A kakemono series exists:
 (浮世風俗) «1905» [] Everyday Customs

A partial list of triptych series includes:
 (花之御所) «1878» [] Flowers of the Imperial Palace
 (全盛廓の賑ひ) «1879» [5] Popular and Prosperous Pleasure Quarters
 (本朝武者鏡) «1881» [] A Mirror of Our Country's Warriors
 (江戸砂子年中行事) «1885»  [ ] Sands of Edo - Annual Events
 (重陽之圗) «1885»  [6] Scenes from a Chrysanthemum Festival
 (渡世振) «1887»  [] Modern Life
 (貴顕之令嬢) «1887»  [] Distinguished Young Ladies
 (朝鮮變報録) «1888» [] Record and Transcript of the Korea Incident
 (日光名所)  «1888» [6] Famous Places of Nikkō
 (松の栄)  «1889» [ ] The Splendor of the Pines 
 (見立曽我)  «1887-9» [7] Parody of the Soga brothers 
 (江戸風俗十二ヶ月の内) «1889» [7] Daily Life in Edo Twelve Months a Year
 (温故東の花) «1889-9» [ ]  Looking into the Past: The Pride of the East
 (雪月花の内) «1891» [32]  Within Serene Beauty
 (西国雅集) «1892» [ ] A Collection of West Country Elegance
 (日本三景の内) «1892» [ ] Three Famous views of Japan
 (全国勝景之内) «1892» [11] Scenic views from around the country 
 (古今倭風俗之内) «1892-3» [6] Customs of Old and Modern Japan
 (倭風俗) «1892-3» [11] Customs and Manners of Yamato 
 (あづま風俗) «1894» [] Daily Life of the East
 (千代田の大奥) {42}«1894-6» [3] The Ladies' Chambers of Chiyoda Palace
 (今様の美人) «1895» [] Contemporary Women
 (十二ヶ月の内) «1895-8» [] Twelve Months
 (花鳥風月) «1895» [7] Beauties of Nature
 (婦人諸禮式の図) «1895-6»  [23] Scenes of Various Women's Ceremonies
  (徳川時代貴婦人) «1896» [2] Ladies of the Tokugawa period
 (七曜之内) «1896» [11] The Seven Days of the Week
 (明治風俗) «1896» [] Meiji Customs
 (松竹梅) «1896» [] Pine, Bamboo, and Plum (Three Friends of Winter)
 (日本歴史教訓画) «1897» [] Pictoral Lessons of Japanese History
 (千代田の御表) {33}  «1898» [3] Chiyoda Palace: Outside the Walls
  (女禮式略の図) «1898» [9]  Handbook of Ladies' Etiquette
  (婦人諸礼式の図) «1899» []  Illustrations of Ceremonies when Ladies gather
  (今とむかし) «1898» [2] Then and Now
 (竹乃一節) «1898-1904» [15] Verses of the Middle Rank 
 (あずま美人) «1897-1903» [] Beautiful Women of the East
 (朝鮮變報) - A Report of the Korean Disturbance
 (流行美人) «~1895-99» [] Fashionable Beauties
 (上野公園) «1899» [2] Ueno Park
 (教育幼稚園之図) «1899» [] Scene of Kindergarten Education
 (倭風俗) «1898» [6] Customs and Manners of Yamato 
 (大磯通之圖) - Scenes of Oisotōri
  (花之御所) - The Flower Palace
 (浮世風俗) «1905» [] Everyday Customs

In addition, his œuvre contains a very large number of three panel scenes with individual titles, not collated into series.  One group of these could be assembled under the heading, "The Royal Household at Play", another could be grouped under "Scenes from the Kabuki", and a third under two sub-titles, "The Satsuma War" and "The Sino-Japanese War.'

An album of twenty-five triptychs was published in 1877 by several artists, including Chikanobu, which brought to light the events of an important domestic insurrection (the Satsuma Rebellion).

A bound album in ōban tate-e format was conceived and assembled by the publisher, Matsuki Heikichi, under the title of "Kyōdō risshiki" [Self-made Men Worthy of Emulation/Exemplars of Learning and Achievement] containing 50 prints (though 53 are known) by various artists including Chikanobu who produced two of the images: #16 Hagaku and # 43 Chikako.  Although the publication dates of the prints in this series ranged from 1885 to 1890, Chikanobu's two contributions to this effort are dated the fourth and fifth months of 1886.

Publishers
Chikanobu's work was printed and disseminated by a variety of publishers.

[1] Kōbayashi Tetsujirō
[2] Hasegawa Tsunejirō
[3] Fukuda Hatsujirō
[4] Narasawa Kenjirō
[5] Takegawa Seikichi
[6] Morimoto Junzaburō
[7] Yokoyama Ryōhachi
[8] Komiyama Shōhei
[9] Takegawa Unokichi
[10] Tsunashima Kamekichi
[11] Hasegawa Sonokichi
[12] Miura Bumei
[13] Yamamura Kinzaburō
[14] Akiyama Buemon
[15] Matsuki Heikichi

[16] Tsujioka Bunsuke
[17] Yamaguchi Yoshi
[18] Arita-ya
[19] Hasegawa Sumi
[20] Toshimo Toshin
[21] Ookura Sonbei
[22] Hatano Tsunesada
[23] Katsuki Yoshikatsu
[24] Matsui Eikichi
[25] Kimura Fukujirō
[26] Murakami Takashi
[27] 亘市兵工
[28]  Asano Eizō
[29] Hayashi Kichi
[30] Inoue Shigeru (heikō)

 [31] Furuchi Korekatsu
 [32] Kashiwagi Nobeichirō

Publisher notes

Notes

Further reading 
 Coats, Bruce; Kyoko Kurita; Joshua S. Mostow and Allen Hockley. (2006). Chikanobu: Modernity And Nostalgia in Japanese Prints. Leiden: Hotei. ; ;  OCLC 255142506
 Till, Barry. (2010). "Woodblock Prints of Meiji Japan (1868-1912): A View of History Though Art".  Hong Kong: Arts of Asia.  Vol. XL, no.4, pp. 76–98.   OCLC 1514382

External links

Ukiyo-e Prints by Toyohara Chikanobu
Chikanobu: The Artist's Eye

Ukiyo-e